McCartan is a surname of Irish origin. It is the anglicized form of Mac cArtáin of Irish origins. The surname denotes the son of Artán, diminutive of the personal name Art, an old Irish word for "bear". They are the Lords of Kinelarty, a barony in the County Down of Northern Ireland. Kinelarty was at one point in time historically known as McCartans-Country and also Cineal Foghartaich. 

The McCartans belong to the Uí Echach Cobo branch resulting from the Dál nAraidi. The McCartans were Ard Rí (High Kings) of Ireland, Kings of Cuib, Princes and Lords of Iveagh holding claim to the longest reigning kingships throughout Irish medieval history. French President Charles de Gaulle is descended from the clan through his great-grandmother Angélique Marie McCartan.

Up until the 1600s, the McCartans were prominent and in control of much of mid-Down (County Down). The McCartan strongholds included Drumaroad, the adjoining townlands Loughinisland, Drumnaquoile, Magheratimpany, Ardilea, and the neighbouring town of Ballynahinch.

The Barony of Kinelarty, anciently known as Kinelfagarty, derives its name from Cenel Faghartaigh (the race/clan of Faghartagh). Faghartagh, from whose son Artan and grandson Artan Agus M‘C, are descended the Mac Artáin (McCartan). The clan were chiefs of the territories of Kinelarty and Dufferin.

Kinelarty and the McCartan Chieftaincy
In prehistoric times territorial boundaries were clearly defined by using dolmens, ritual sites and standing stones as markers. Such monuments can be found today at Slidderyford (Dundrum), Legananny (Slieve Croob), Annadorn (Loughinisland), Kilygoney (Ballynahinch) and Magheraknock (Ballynahinch).

On modern maps this area is an outline of the present barony of Kinelarty, with Loughinisland as a central hub. Interesting place names that are presently to be found in the Loughinisland area are such as:

Rosconnor (woods at Connor’s point)
Rademon (rath of Deman)
Castlenavan (Eamhain’s Cashel)
Tareesh (the King’s house)
Kilmoremorean (Morean's big church)
Cahirvor (the big seat)

These and further evidence in ancient manuscripts, provide confirmation of an ancient Kingship and Noble standing. At the Battle of Fontenoy in 1745 many McCartans fought on the French side against English regiments commanded by the landlords of their patrimony in County Down.

Forde, Annesley, Price, Maxwell and Johnston family members were prominent officers.

Modern successes
Dr Patrick McCartan was the Dáil envoy to Washington in 1920 and in later years became a presidential candidate. In recent years more McCartan members have also held seats in Dail Eireann and in the European Parliament.

Edward McCartan, an American sculptor, is notable for his many works, including his reworking masterpiece of the Goddess Diana.

As a family bursting with football endeavors, albeit predominantly within the Gaelic adaptation of the sport, Seamus Vincent McCartan is the clan's single professional player, currently at club level for Bradford City. His international career has spanned U17, U19 and U21 levels. He made his highly anticipated International First Team debut in 2017.

Ryan McCartan, portraying the character Digbert "Diggie" Smalls on Disney's Liv and Maddie, has risen to success, showcasing the musical and theatrical talents of the clan.

Links to the Guinness family
Trinity College Dublin tested the Y chromosome of a male member of the Guinness Brewery family, revealing that the claim that brewery founder Sir Arthur Guinness was a descendant of the Magennis chieftains (of Iveagh in County Down) was incorrect, but rather that the family sprang from the McCartan clan.

People
 Mac Cairthinn of Clogher (died 506), Irish Christian convert of St Patrick
 Daniel McCartan, Gaelic footballer, brother of James McCartan Jnr
 Edward McCartan (1879-1947), American sculptor
 Jack McCartan (born 1935), American hockey goaltender
 James McCartan Jnr,  Gaelic footballer (1990-2000) and manager
 James McCartan Snr, Gaelic footballer (1950s-1960s) and manager (1980s), father of the above
 Karl McCartan (born 2005), Irish Tiktoker, upcoming model
 Michael McCartan (1851–1902), Irish nationalist politician, MP for South Down 1886–1902
 Pat McCartan (born 1953), Irish judge and former politician
 Patrick McCartan (1878-1963), Irish republican and politician
 Ryan McCartan (born 1993), American actor, singer and songwriter
 Sam McCartan, Gaelic footballer for Westmeath
 Shay McCartan (born 1994), Northern Irish footballer

See also
 Arthur Guinness, confirmed to have McCartan origins
 Guinness family, the prominent Anglo-Irish family
 Earl of Iveagh
 Heirs of the body
 Lords of Kinelarty

References

 Patrick Guinness the author of Arthur's Round (2006) The McCartans of Kinelarty by Thérése Ghesquiére-Diérickx and Sean McCartan. (Translations by Dr Eamon O’Ciosan)
 Culture Northern Ireland - http://www.culturenorthernireland.org/article/1197/a-history-of-drumaroad
 Irish Family History - A History of the Clanna-Rory or Rudricians, Descendants of Roderick the Great, Monarch of Ireland. (Compiled From the Ancient Records in the Libraries of Trinity College and the Royal Irish Academy.)

Irish families
Surnames of Irish origin
Ulaid